The 1978–79 Birmingham Bulls season was the Bulls' final season of operation in the World Hockey Association (WHA).

Offseason

Regular season

Final standings

Game log

Player stats

Awards and records

Transactions

Farm teams

See also
1978–79 WHA season

References

External links

Birm
Birm
Birmingham Bulls seasons